The 58th Grand Bell Awards, also known as Daejong International Film Awards, is determined and presented annually by The Motion Pictures Association of Korea for excellence in film in South Korea. The Grand Bell Awards were first presented in 1962 and have gained prestige as the Korean equivalent of the American Academy Awards. The 58th Daejong International Film Festival originally scheduled to be held in mid-June, but it was postponed for December 2022. The ceremony was held at the New Millennium Hall, Konkuk University in Seoul on December 9, 2022. Hosted by Kim Tae-hoon and Kang Na-yeon, it was aired live on ENA, YouTube and Twitter.

Judge 
 List of seven additional judges appointed by the Korean Film Association.
 Yim Soon-rye, Director 
 Bae Jong-ok, Actress
 Kim Seon-ah, Professor
 Tae Bo-ra; Professor
 Park Jong-won, Director
 Yang Dong-geun, Actor
 7 senior judges and 4 former judges
 Bang Soon-jung, President of the Korean Writers' Association
 Lee Jin-young, President of the Korean Film Actors Association
 Kim Ki-tae, President of the Korean Filmmakers Association
 Kang Dae-young, President of the Korean Society of Cinematographers

Winners and nominees 

The nominees for the 58th Grand Bell Awards were announced on 12 October 2022, nominations were eligible for films released in South Korea from October 1, 2021 to September 30, 2022.    

Winners are listed first, highlighted in boldface, and indicated with a double dagger.

Films with multiple nominations 
The following films received multiple nominations:

See also 

58th Baeksang Arts Awards
Chunsa Film Art Awards 2022
31st Buil Film Awards
43rd Blue Dragon Film Awards

References 

G
Grand Bell Awards
2022 in South Korean cinema
Events in Seoul